Graffiti is a computer program which makes conjectures in various subfields of mathematics (particularly graph theory) and chemistry, but can be adapted to other fields. It was written by Siemion Fajtlowicz and Ermelinda DeLaViña at the University of Houston. Research on conjectures produced by Graffiti has led to over 60 publications by other mathematicians.

References

External links
Graffiti & Automated Conjecture-Making
Siemion Fajtlowicz 

Chemistry software
Mathematical software